Qojur may refer to:
 Qojur, Kurdistan
 Qojur, Divandarreh, Kurdistan Province
 Qojur, West Azerbaijan
 Qojur, Zanjan